Lieutenant General Imran Ullah Khan  (born 3 December 1932) is a retired Pakistan Army general. He remained the Governor of Balochistan province in PPP-led government from May 1994 to May 1997.

Early life and education

General Imran Ullah Khan was born on 3 December 1932, in Shamozai to a local landlord family in the village (Now Town) of Utmanzai in Charsadda District of Khyber-Pakhtunkhwa province of Pakistan. The family belongs to the Utmanzai branch of the distinguished Kheshgi family. His father, Major Saadullah Khan, was a direct descendant of Malik Utman who founded the village/town of Utmanzai.

Imran Ullah Khan is the eldest of the four sons. He received his education from Bishop Cotton School Simla (Now India), Lawrence College Murree and Government College Lahore.

Career

After completing his education Imran Ullah Khan joined Pakistan Army and was sent to Royal Military Academy Sandhurst in England. On graduation from Royal Military Academy Sandhurst UK, he was commissioned into the Frontier Force Regiment on 18 September 1955 in the 12th PMA Long Course.

Serving Pakistan army he took part in 1965 war as a captain and in 1971 war as a Battalion Commander. He also participated in the Siachin operation as a Corps Commander.

A graduate of Royal Military Academy Sandhurst, Command and Staff College Quetta and Pakistan Air Force Staff College Karachi General Imran Ullah Khan also distinguished himself at the Royal College of Defence Studies, London UK. General Imran Ullah Khan has served on various important staff and instructional appointments during his career. These include Instructor at the School of Military Intelligence Kuldana, Murree, Instructor at Command and Staff College Quetta, Commandant Pakistan Military Academy and Director of Military Training.

Commands

General Imran Ullah khan has had the privilege of commanding an infantry brigade on the Line of Control. As a Brigadier, he also had the distinction of holding the appointment of Director of Military Training Pakistan Army. In January 1978 he was appointed the Commandant of Pakistan Military Academy Kakul. He held this coveted post for over four years both as a Brigadier and Major General. In May 1982 he was posted as General Officer Commanding of the 10th Infantry Division at Lahore.

In May 1984 he was posted as Adjutant General of Pakistan Army at GHQ and in May 1987 he was posted to command the X Corps, the largest Corps of Pakistan Army, which is one of the two corps on the Line of Control. In this position he was responsible for operations in Siachen.  He is credited with Pakistani successes at Chumik and in Operation Qidaat.

Criticism
Humanitarian and Philanthropist Abdul Sattar Edhi alleged that Lt. Gen Hamid Gul and Lt. Gen Imran Ullah Khan asked him to join their pressure group in order to topple Benazir's government.

Retirement and governorship
General Imran Ullah Khan retired from the Army in May 1991 having put in 36 years of commissioned service and in May 1994, he was appointed as the Governor of Balochistan by Prime Minister Benazir Bhutto. He resigned from Governorship for personal reasons in May 1997.

Awards and decorations

References

1932 births
Frontier Force Regiment officers
Governors of Balochistan, Pakistan
Pakistani generals
Pashtun people
People from Charsadda District, Pakistan
Living people